Sinosticta is a genus of shadowdamsel in the damselfly family Platystictidae. There are at least four described species in Sinosticta.

Species
These four species belong to the genus Sinosticta:
 Sinosticta debra Wilson & Xu, 2007
 Sinosticta hainanense Wilson & Reels, 2001
 Sinosticta ogatai (Matsuki & Saito, 1996)
 Sinosticta sylvatica Yu & Bu, 2009

References

Further reading

 
 
 

Platystictidae
Articles created by Qbugbot